Thikka is 2016 Indian Telugu-language action comedy film produced by Dr. Rohin Reddy on Sri Venkateswara Movie Makers banner and directed by Sunil Reddy. Starring Sai Dharam Tej, Larissa Bonesi and Mannara Chopra, with Rajendra Prasad, Ajay, Ali, Raghu Babu and Vennela Kishore in supporting roles, the music is composed by S. Thaman. Production began on 31 July 2015 in Hyderabad. The film was released on 13 August 2016. The film received negative reviews from critics, but they praised and appreciated Tej's performance. However, they criticized the direction, storyline, irrational and confusing screenplay and the incoherent script. The film was a box office bomb. Mannara Chopra won Special Jury Award for Best Actress at 15th Santosham Film Awards.

Plot
The film is a confusion kidnap drama; Aditya (Sai Dharam Tej) is a booze-happy youngster who enjoys his day-to-day life until he meets a beautiful girl Anjali in an accident. He falls in love with her at first sight itself and also makes her fall in love with him too. After she entered to his life the entire lifestyle changes he leaves one by one all his bad habits, acquires a job in a corporate company and she also separates Aditya from his father Manohar (Rajendra Prasad) who is a big womanizer and drunker than him and also joins Manohar in a rehabilitation center.

The twist in the story arises when complications erupt between the couple and they break up with each other for a small quarrel. Anjali is a daughter of a multimillionaire Madan Mohan (Anand) who fixes her marriage with another rich man's son Jayanth (Vennela Kishore). Simultaneously in the office, Aditya conned by Kapoor (Ali) who wants to give promotion to his girlfriend Kavitha (Mumaith Khan), so he traps Aditya makes him cheat his childhood friend Stephen (Sathya) which makes the conflict between them.

The frustrated Aditya call for a break up party along with his friends where so many characters enter into his life, Starting from his father Manohar escaping from rehabilitation center along with a girl Kamala (VJ Bani) his lover, who is a daughter of a late mafia don Devraj (Jakki), then a prostitute Padma come into the picture, suddenly two gangs of Sadhu Bhai (Ajay) and Narasimha (Raghu Babu) are after Aditya. A series of mad events follow - they fight with some guys, destroy a restaurant, a petrol bunk is burnt, etc. More on that Anjali elopes from marriage for Aditya and her father Madan Mohan's men are also behind him and another beautiful girl Virisha (Mannara Chopra) tries to kill Aditya saying herself as his ex-lover. Rest of the story how Aditya comes out from this crazy situation.

Cast

Sai Dharam Tej as Aditya
Larissa Bonesi as Anjali
Mannara Chopra as Virisha
Rajendra Prasad as Manohar
Ajay as Sadhu Bhai
Ali as Kapoor
Vennela Kishore as Jayanth
Posani Krishna Murali as Inspector P. Hymanand
Raghu Babu as Narsimha  
Mumaith Khan as Kavitha
VJ Bani as Kamala
Anand as Madan Mohan
Harsha Vardhan as Mental Doctor
Jakki as Devraj 
Prabhas Sreenu as Madan Mohan's henchmen
Saptagiri as Manchi Donga  
Satya as Stephen
Thagubothu Ramesh as Ramesh Yadav     
Fish Venkat as Sadhu's henchmen
Dasanna as Constable
Kamna Singh as Padma

Soundtrack

Music composed by S. Thaman. Music released on Aditya Music Company. Audio launch held on 30 July 2016 at Shilpakala Vedika, Hyderabad.

Critical reception
The film received mixed-to-negative reviews from critics, praising Sai Dharam Tej's performance while heavily criticizing its story, many considering it to be very confusing and weak. 123Telugu gave it a 2.25/5 saying "Overall, Thikka is one film which Sai Dharam Tej should immediately erase from his memory. He should stay away from scripts like these which can spoil his career big time. Except for his sincere performance, this film has absolutely nothing to offer in any which way possible. Stay away from this one otherwise, you can end up losing your mind."

References

External links
 

2016 films
2016 action comedy films
Indian action comedy films
2010s Telugu-language films
Films scored by Thaman S
2016 comedy films